The Chorão Epidemic killed over a thousand women, men and children in Chorão, an island along the Mandovi River near Ilhas, Goa, India. It also caused thousands to flee the island, and led to the closure of Real Colégio de Educação de Chorão in 1859. The Epidemic and its after-effects left the island deserted for almost 100 years.

History
In the Second half of 18th century the population of Chorão reached its peak 22000; 14,000 of these residents at St Bartholomew's Church (Chorão Island) and the remaining 8000 in the parish of Our Lady of Grace Church (Chorão Island).

The Epidemic started in year 1766 but it is believed that its consequences were very alamaring in 1775. The fever that ravaged the Island of Chorão was of such a virulent type that within a year it caused its decadence. The epidemic first started in the Parish of Our Lady of Grace Church (Chorão Island) in June 1775, rapidly spreading throughout the Island, especially in the village of Querem, a large populated area and destroyed its population completely. In the Our Lady of Grace Church (Chorão Island), within a period of less than six months the population came down from 8000 souls to 1700. Entire families disappeared, others left the Island and proceed wherever they could get a place but a few not wishing to leave the land of their ancestors, remained in the Parish of Our Lady of Grace Church (Chorão Island).

In 1808 the Communidade of Chorão was granted permission by Portuguese Government to construct new houses to attract outsiders invited to take up their residence in the Island. Years later, between 1809 and 1812 the same Communidade attempted to enter the names of the newcomers in the book of Joneiros as Componentes, but to no avail due to the fact that then number of the new inhabitants went down considerably again caused by the fever that was then raging.

According to French traveller Denis Louis Cottineau de Kloguen who visited the Island "Chorão Island was formerly pretty populous, but is now almost deserted, being deemed very unhealthy: the whole number of individuals on the Island is about one hundred and fifty".

According to José Nicolau Da Fonseca "Chorão Island once had many villas owned by Portuguese grandees but the island is now almost deserted, on account of its insalubrity.

After a lapse of many years the fever re-appeared in Chorão Island in 1878, increasing the toll of human life and causing a lot of damage. Several rich families also left the Island.

When the whole world was in the grip of 1918 flu pandemic, the island of Chorão claimed the list number of victims as compared to the other villages of Goa according to Vicar Fr. Cota.

Causes
According to Teresa Alburquerque "Chorão Island was raged by a violent epidemic of Influenza. But the Epidemic was attributed to many causes: among them was the absence of free ventilation of air which was stifled and vitiated by dense willows on one side and on the other by hill that obstructed the houses; warm and heavy air caused by rocks and scarcity of good drinking water during hot season, which obliged the people to have re-course to well water, at a time when most of the wells were contaminated due to various causes.

Diaspora
Emigration had become one of the important factors in the development of its riches and there are now many illustrious person, natives of Chorão Island, living outside Goa who are filling high positions and have brought honour to the land of their father, thereby maintaining the traditions of the Chorão Island.

References

Bibliography
The Island of Chorão (A Historical Sketch) By Francisco Xavier Gomes Catão, Mar Louis Memorial Press, Alwaye (1962)
An Historical Sketch of Goa, the Metropolis of the Portuguese Settlement in India By Denis Louis Cottineau de Kloguen, Publisher Madras : W. Twigg, (1831)
An Historical and Archaeological Sketch of the City of Goa By José Nicolau Da Fonseca (1878)

Notes

Chorão (Island)
18th-century health disasters
19th-century health disasters
History of Goa
1766 disasters in Asia 
1775 disasters in Asia 
1878 disasters in Asia